Riot House Records is an independent record label specializing in rock, indie, and punk bands.

History
Riot House Records was founded in 2010 by Brian Jenkins with the purpose of releasing "rock and roll records with grit and soul." The label is part of the Independent Label Distribution group, along with Sympathy for the Record Industry, Frontier Records, and Tank Crimes.

In January 2013 it was announced that Interpol's drummer Sam Fogarino had formed a new band, EmptyMansions, who signed to the label. The record titled snakes/vultures/sulfate was produced by Brandon Curtis (The Secret Machines) and features Duane Denison (Tomahawk, The Jesus Lizard) on lead guitar.

The label's current active roster includes Rough Francis, Spencer Moody of The Murder City Devils, Porcupine, and Buildings.

Riot House will release its first film, Records Collecting Dust "...a documentary film about the music and records that changed our lives", in Winter 2014. The film was written and directed by San Diego musician Jason Blackmore and features interviews with Jello Biafra, Keith Morris, Chuck Dukowski, Mike Watt, John Reis, and over 30 other underground rock icons. The film also features live performances from Jello Biafra and the Guantanamo School of Medicine, The Locust, and Big Business.

Roster
 Black Jet Radio
 Buildings
 EmptyMansions
 Grand Strand
 Porcupine
 Rough Francis
 The Sacred Broncos
 Spencer Moody
 Whitemare
 White Mule

Discography
 Jinx and the Back Alley Cats Fish as Friends RHR-001
 The Sacred Broncos Don't Mind /// Lions RHR-002
 Black Jet Radio Dead Wine // Ugly RHR-003
 Black Jet Radio Sex Sex Riot RHR-004
 Grand Strand Cactus Blooms RHR-005
 EmptyMansions snakes/vultures/sulfate RHR-006
 Whitemare Screamer EP RHR-007
 Porcupine I See Sound RHR-008
 Rough Francis Maximum Soul Power RHR-009
 Buildings It Doesn't Matter RHR-010
 White Mule White Mule RHR-011
 Spencer Moody Single Car Accident b/w Polish Handgun RHR-012
 Grand Tarantula Slime Times RHR-013
 Rough Francis MSP2 b/w Blind Pigs RHR-014

References

American record labels